Thippaji Circle  is a 2015 Indian Kannada-language drama film written and directed by Aditya Chikkanna. The film stars Pooja Gandhi and Suresh Sharma. The supporting cast features Bhavya, Neha Patil and Dhruva Sharma.

The movie narrates the life of a devadasi, Thippava (Pooja Gandhi), and is based on a novel by B. L. Venu. Venu also wrote the film's dialogues, for which he earned an award at the 2014 Karnataka State Film Awards.

Cast 

 Pooja Gandhi
 Suresh Sharma, 
 Dhruva Sharma, 
 Neha Patil 
 Bhavya
 Anitha Bhat

Soundtrack

The music was composed by Baranishree and released by Lahari Music.

References

2010s Kannada-language films
2015 films
Indian drama films
2015 drama films